The Bridgend Deanery is a Roman Catholic deanery in the Archdiocese of Cardiff that covers several churches in Bridgend and the Vale of Glamorgan.

The dean is centred at St Mary's Church in Bridgend.

Churches 
 St Mary, Bridgend
 Our Lady Star of the Sea, Porthcawl - served from Bridgend
 St Joseph of Arimathea, Pyle - served from Bridgend
 Our Lady and Illtyd, Llantwit Major
 St Cadoc, Cowbridge - served from Llantwit Manor
 Our Lady and St Patrick, Maesteg
 St Robert of Newminster, Aberkenfig - served from Maesteg

Gallery

References

External links
 St Mary Church Bridgend site
 Our Lady Star of the Sea Church Portcawl site
 Our Lady and St Patrick Church Maesteg site
 Our Lady and St Illtyd Parish Llantwit Major site

Roman Catholic Deaneries in the Archdiocese of Cardiff